The House of Bismarck is a German noble family that rose to prominence in the 19th century, largely through the achievements of the statesman Otto von Bismarck. He was granted a hereditary comital title in 1865, the hereditary title of Prince of Bismarck in 1871, and the non-hereditary title of Duke of Lauenburg in 1890. Several of Otto von Bismarck's descendants, notably his elder son Herbert, Prince of Bismarck, were also politicians.

History
The family has its roots in the Altmark region, descending from Herebord von Bismarck (d. 1280), the first verifiable holder of the name, mentioned about 1270 as an official (Schultheiß) at the city of Stendal in the Margraviate of Brandenburg. His descent from the nearby small town of Bismark is conceivable though not ascertained. Herebord was head of the Dressmakers' Guild. 

During the following two generations, the family seems to have gained knightly status. Herebord's great-grandson, Nicolaus (Klaus) von Bismarck, mentioned in 1328 and 1377, was a councillor and a loyal supporter of the Wittelsbach margrave Louis I, over which he fell out with the revolting Stendal citizens and was compensated with the manor and estate of Burgstall in 1345. Also parts of this estate were the villages Briest and Döbbelin which later became the seats of two family branches. By a 1562 agreement with the Hohenzollern margraves, the Bismarcks swapped Burgstall with Schönhausen and Fischbeck, located east of the Elbe river and formerly part of the Archbishopric of Magdeburg, which also had been under Hohenzollern rule since 1513, as well as the secularized former abbey of Krevese. Thus two lines emerged: The Bismarcks of Schönhausen and those of Crevese. Both lines split into two branches in the early 18th century, with two new manor houses built at Schönhausen. The Crevese branch was further divided into Crevese-Briest and Döbbelin. The manor of Briest had been newly built in 1624, that of Döbbelin in 1736. The estate of Krevese was sold in 1819, the estate of Schönhausen II in 1830. Notable members of the Crevese-Briest branch of the family were Levin Friedrich von Bismarck (1703-1774) and his son August Wilhelm von Bismarck (1750–1783), both Prussian ministers (of Justice and Finances) under Frederick the Great; Georg von Bismarck, a German general during World War II, also belonged to that branch. 

In 1815, the Prussian Junker family's most notable member, Otto von Bismarck, was born in the manor Schönhausen I. Prime Minister of Prussia since 1862, he gained the comital title (Graf) of Bismarck-Schönhausen in 1865 and the hereditary princely status of a Fürst von Bismarck after the Franco-Prussian War in 1871, followed by the Proclamation of the German Empire on 18 January 1871. He served as Germany's first chancellor until 1890. In 1871, he was granted the Sachsenwald forest near Hamburg for his achievements, namely for the Unification of Germany. He took up his residence at Friedrichsruh Castle in the Sachsenwald. Today the forest area amounts to about 6,000 hectares, of which about a half is still owned by the House of Bismarck. The manor house at Friedrichsruh was destroyed in an RAF raid in 1945 and rebuilt after World War II. Prince Otto's other estates, his birth manor Schönhausen I, the manor of Schönhausen II, which he had received as a grant from the German nation in 1885, as well as the estate of Varzin (today Warcino, Poland) in Farther Pomerania, were expropriated in 1945 as a result of the communists' seizure of power in East Germany and the expulsion of the Germans from Prussian provinces annexed by Poland. A number of other branches of the family also lost their ancestral possessions in this way, among them the branches of Briest and Döbbelin as well as the Counts von Bismarck-Bohlen at Karlsburg, who had been raised to the rank of counts in 1818. The estates of Briest and Döbbelin have both been bought back by two respective family branches after the German reunification of 1990.

Otto's elder son Herbert, Prince von Bismarck, served his father as Secretary for Foreign Affairs between 1886 and 1890 and the younger son, Count Wilhelm von Bismarck-Schönhausen, as a member of the Reichstag and president of the Regency of the Province of Hanover. Both resigned their posts after their father was dismissed as Chancellor of Germany in 1890. Wilhelm subsequently accepted an appointment as Governor of East Prussia in 1894. Herbert's elder son Otto Christian Archibald, Prince von Bismarck (1897–1975), became a diplomat and later a member of the Bundestag, while the younger son, Gottfried (1901–1949), was a member of the Reichstag. The present prince, Carl-Eduard von Bismarck (b. 1961), is also a former member of the Bundestag. 

Two ships of the German Imperial Navy (Kaiserliche Marine), as well as a battleship from the World War II era, were named after Otto von Bismarck. Also named in his honour were the Bismarck Sea and Bismarck Archipelago (both near the former German colony of New Guinea), as well as several places in the United States, among them Bismarck, North Dakota, the state's capital.

Schönhausen line

 Jkr. Karl Alexander von Bismarck (1727–1797) – married in 1762 Christiane Charlotte Gottliebe von Schönfeldt at Werben
 Jkr. Ernst Friedrich Alexander von Bismarck (1763–1820)
 Jkr. Theodor von Bismarck (1790–1873), married in 1817 Karoline Countess von Bohlen, progenitor of the comital Bismarck-Bohlen branch
[...]
 Jkr. Friedrich Adolf Ludwig von Bismarck (1766–1830), Prussian General Lieutenant
 Jkr. Karl Wilhelm Ferdinand von Bismarck (1771–1845), landowner at Schönhausen, married in 1806 Luise Wilhelmine Mencken
  Jkr. Bernhard von Bismarck (1810–1893), Prussian chamberlain (Kammerherr), member of the Prussian Landtag, married  in 1841 Adelheid Fanninger (died 1844), secondly in 1848 Malwine von Lettow-Vorbeck
 Jkr. Philipp von Bismarck (1844–1894)
 Jkr. Gottfried von Bismarck (1881–1928)
 Jkr. Klaus von Bismarck (1912–1997), Director General of the Westdeutscher Rundfunk (West German Broadcasting) 
 Jkr. Philipp von Bismarck (1913–2006), former member of the Bundestag
 Jkr. Herbert Rudolf von Bismarck (1884–1955), Member of the Prussian House of Representatives and the Reichstag
 HSH Otto, Prince von Bismarck, Duke of Lauenburg (1815–1898), First Chancellor of Germany, Fürst von Bismarck from 1871; heir of Schönhausen I, acquired Varzin and the Sachsenwald forest with Friedrichsruh; m. Johanna von Puttkamer 
 Countess Marie von Bismarck-Schönhausen (1847–1926), m. Cuno, Count zu Rantzau
 HSH Herbert, Prince von Bismarck (1849–1904), Secretary for Foreign Affairs; m. Marguerite, Countess of Hoyos
 Countess Hannah Leopoldine Alice (1893–1971), m. Leopold von Bredow
 Countess Maria Goedela (1896–1981), m. Count Hermann Keyserling (1880–1946)
 Count Manfred Keyserling (1920–2008)
 Count Arnold Keyserling (1922–2005), renowned philosopher
 HSH Otto Christian Archibald, Prince von Bismarck (1897–1975), diplomat, member of the Bundestag; m. Ann-Mari Tengbom
 HSH Ferdinand, Prince von Bismarck (1930-2019), m. Elisabeth, countess Lippens
 HSH Carl-Eduard, Prince von Bismarck (born 1961), former member of the Bundestag
 Count Alexei von Bismarck-Schönhausen
 Countess Grace 
 Count Gottfried von Bismarck-Schönhausen (1962–2007)
 Count Gregor von Bismarck-Schönhausen (born 1964)
Countess Marina (born 1986)
Count Léon (born 2002)
Count Otis (born 2007)
Countess Wilhelmina (born 2009)
 Countess Vanessa (born 1971)
Count Alexander von Bismarck-Schönhausen (1935–1992)
Countess Claudia Anna Katharine Mona (born 1964)
  Count Maximilian von Bismarck-Schönhausen (born 1947)
 Count Konstantin von Bismarck-Schönhausen (born 1987)
 Count Victor Alexander von Bismarck-Schönhausen (born 1989)
  Countess Gunilla (born 1949)
  Count Leopold von Bismarck-Schönhausen (born 1951)
 Count Nikolai von Bismarck (born 1986)
 Count Gottfried von Bismarck-Schönhausen (1901–1949), member of the Reichstag; m. Melanie, Countess von Hoyos 
 Countess Vendeline 
 Countess Barbara (1939-1986)
 Count Andreas von Bismarck-Schönhausen (1941-2013)
 Countess Christine von Bismarck-Schönhausen (born 1965) ∞ Guy du Boulay Villax
 Countess Stephanie von Bismarck-Schönhausen (born 1976) ∞ Baron Karl-Theodor zu Guttenberg (born 1971), former Federal Minister for Economics and Defence 
 Count Albrecht von Bismarck-Schönhausen (1903–1970)  ∞ Mona Strader (1897–1983)
 Count Wilhelm von Bismarck-Schönhausen (1852–1901), member of the Reichstag and president of the Regency of the Province of Hanover, Governor of East Prussia 
 Countess Herta (b. 1886)
 Countess Irene (1888-1982), m. 1) Herbert Count von Einsiedel; 2) Horst von Petersdorff
 Countess Dorothee (1892-1975), m. 1) Reinhold Count von Rehbinder; 2) Wilhelm Friedrich von Löwenfeld
 Count Nikolaus von Bismarck-Schönhausen (1896-1940), m. 1) Brigitte von Eickstedt-Peterswaldt; 2) Elisabeth Countess von Faber-Castell
 Count Rule von Bismarck-Schönhausen (b. 1920), m. Olga Huneeus Cox
 Countess Beatrix (1921-2006), m. Christian Heinrich Prince of Sayn-Wittgenstein-Hohenstein
 Jkvr. Malwine von Bismarck (1827–1908)

References

External links

 

German noble families
Political families of Germany